Khojewali  is a village in Kapurthala district of Punjab State, India. The village is administrated by a Sarpanch, who is an elected representative.

Demography 
According to the report published by Census India in 2011, Khojewali has total number of 258 houses and population of 1,308 of which include 685 males and 623 females. Literacy rate of Khojewali is 84.40%, higher than state average of 75.84%.  The population of children under the age of 6 years is 135 which is 10.32% of total population of Khojewali, and child sex ratio is approximately  1077, higher than state average of 846.

Population data

Air travel connectivity 
The closest airport to the village is Sri Guru Ram Dass Jee International Airport.

Villages in Kapurthala

References

External links
  Villages in Kapurthala
 Kapurthala Villages List

Villages in Kapurthala district